The 2022 Women's Ball Hockey World Championship ( or ) was the eighth women's ball hockey tournament to be held as part of the Ball Hockey World Championship. It was organized by the International Street and Ball Hockey Federation in collaboration with the Canadian Ball Hockey Association and was held at the Place Bell in Laval, Quebec, Canada. The tournament began on 21 June 2022 and medal games were played 27 June 2022.

The Canadian women's national ball hockey team earned their sixth World Championship title after claiming a 3–2 victory over the Czech Republic in the gold medal game.

Venue

Participants 
 Canada
 Czech Republic
 Great Britain
 Lebanon
 Slovakia
 United States

Round-robin

Standings

Results

Fifth place game 
All times in Eastern Daylight Time (UTC−04:00)

Finals

Bracket

Results
All times in Eastern Daylight Time (UTC−04:00)

Semifinals

Bronze medal game

Gold medal game

Awards 

Individual awards

Source: 

All-Star team

Final ranking

Rosters

References

Game references

Ball Hockey World Championship
International sports competitions hosted by Canada
Sport in Laval, Quebec
June 2022 sports events in Canada